Lago Verde Airport ,  is an airport just north of Lago Verde, a lakeside village in the Aysén Region of Chile.

Runway 04 has an additional  of unpaved overrun. Approach to Runway 04 is over the lake.

There is mountainous terrain in all quadrants

See also

Transport in Chile
List of airports in Chile

References

External links
OpenStreetMap - Lago Verde
SkyVector - Lago Verde

Airports in Aysén Region